William Joel Pacho Tenorio (born 16 October 2001) is an Ecuadorian professional footballer who plays as a defender for Belgian club Antwerp.

Club career
On 28 January 2022, Pacho signed a five-year contract with Antwerp in Belgium.

Career statistics

Club

References

2001 births
Living people
People from Quinindé
Ecuadorian footballers
Association football defenders
Ecuador youth international footballers
2022 FIFA World Cup players
Ecuadorian Serie A players
Belgian Pro League players
C.S.D. Independiente del Valle footballers
Royal Antwerp F.C. players
Ecuadorian expatriate footballers
Ecuadorian expatriate sportspeople in Belgium
Expatriate footballers in Belgium